The arrondissement of Albi is an arrondissement of France in the Tarn department in the Occitanie region. Its INSEE code is 811 and its capital city is Albi. It has 163 communes. It is the northernmost of the arrondissements of the department.

The main cities, with more than 5,000 inhabitants in 2012, in the arrondissement are Albi (49,231 inhabitants), Gaillac (13,820 inhabitants), Carmaux (9,774 inhabitants), Saint-Juéry (6,715 inhabitants) and Rabastens (5,187 inhabitants).

Geography
The arrondissement of Albi is bordered to the north by the Tarn-et-Garonne (Occitanie) department, to the west by the Aveyron (Occitanie) department, to the south by the arrondissement of Castres and to the south by the Haute-Garonne (Occitanie) department.

Composition

The communes of the arrondissement of Albi, and their INSEE codes, are:

 Alban (81003)
 Albi (81004)
 Almayrac (81008)
 Alos (81007)
 Amarens (81009)
 Ambialet (81010)
 Andillac (81012)
 Andouque (81013)
 Arthès (81018)
 Assac (81019)
 Aussac (81020)
 Beauvais-sur-Tescou (81024)
 Bellegarde-Marsal (81026)
 Bernac (81029)
 Blaye-les-Mines (81033)
 Bournazel (81035)
 Brens (81038)
 Broze (81041)
 Les Cabannes (81045)
 Cadalen (81046)
 Cadix (81047)
 Cagnac-les-Mines (81048)
 Cahuzac-sur-Vère (81051)
 Cambon (81052)
 Campagnac (81056)
 Carlus (81059)
 Carmaux (81060)
 Castanet (81061)
 Castelnau-de-Lévis (81063)
 Castelnau-de-Montmiral (81064)
 Cestayrols (81067)
 Combefa (81068)
 Cordes-sur-Ciel (81069)
 Coufouleux (81070)
 Courris (81071)
 Crespin (81072)
 Crespinet (81073)
 Cunac (81074)
 Curvalle (81077)
 Dénat (81079)
 Donnazac (81080)
 Le Dourn (81082)
 Fauch (81088)
 Faussergues (81089)
 Fayssac (81087)
 Fénols (81090)
 Florentin (81093)
 Fraissines (81094)
 Frausseilles (81095)
 Le Fraysse (81096)
 Fréjairolles (81097)
 Gaillac (81099)
 Le Garric (81101)
 Grazac (81106)
 Itzac (81108)
 Jouqueviel (81110)
 Labarthe-Bleys (81111)
 Labastide-de-Lévis (81112)
 Labastide-Gabausse (81114)
 Labessière-Candeil (81117)
 Laboutarie (81119)
 Lacapelle-Pinet (81122)
 Lacapelle-Ségalar (81123)
 Lagrave (81131)
 Lamillarié (81133)
 Laparrouquial (81135)
 Larroque (81136)
 Lasgraisses (81138)
 Lédas-et-Penthiès (81141)
 Lescure-d'Albigeois (81144)
 Lisle-sur-Tarn (81145)
 Livers-Cazelles (81146)
 Lombers (81147)
 Loubers (81148)
 Loupiac (81149)
 Mailhoc (81152)
 Marnaves (81154)
 Marssac-sur-Tarn (81156)
 Massals (81161)
 Mézens (81164)
 Milhars (81165)
 Milhavet (81166)
 Miolles (81167)
 Mirandol-Bourgnounac (81168)
 Monestiés (81170)
 Montans (81171)
 Montauriol (81172)
 Montdurausse (81175)
 Montels (81176)
 Montgaillard (81178)
 Montirat (81180)
 Montrosier (81184)
 Montvalen (81185)
 Moularès (81186)
 Mouzieys-Panens (81191)
 Mouzieys-Teulet (81190)
 Noailles (81197)
 Orban (81198)
 Padiès (81199)
 Pampelonne (81201)
 Parisot (81202)
 Paulinet (81203)
 Penne (81206)
 Peyrole (81208)
 Poulan-Pouzols (81211)
 Puycelsi (81217)
 Puygouzon (81218)
 Rabastens (81220)
 Réalmont (81222)
 Le Riols (81224)
 Rivières (81225)
 Roquemaure (81228)
 Rosières (81230)
 Rouffiac (81232)
 Roussayrolles (81234)
 Saint-André (81240)
 Saint-Beauzile (81243)
 Saint-Benoît-de-Carmaux (81244)
 Saint-Christophe (81245)
 Saint-Cirgue (81247)
 Sainte-Cécile-du-Cayrou (81246)
 Sainte-Croix (81326)
 Sainte-Gemme (81249)
 Saint-Grégoire (81253)
 Saint-Jean-de-Marcel (81254)
 Saint-Juéry (81257)
 Saint-Julien-Gaulène (81259)
 Saint-Marcel-Campes (81262)
 Saint-Martin-Laguépie (81263)
 Saint-Michel-de-Vax (81265)
 Saint-Michel-Labadié (81264)
 Saint-Urcisse (81272)
 Saliès (81274)
 Salles (81275)
 Salvagnac (81276)
 Saussenac (81277)
 La Sauzière-Saint-Jean (81279)
 Le Ségur (81280)
 Senouillac (81283)
 Le Sequestre (81284)
 Sérénac (81285)
 Sieurac (81287)
 Souel (81290)
 Taïx (81291)
 Tanus (81292)
 Tauriac (81293)
 Técou (81294)
 Teillet (81295)
 Terre-de-Bancalié (81233)
 Terssac (81297)
 Tonnac (81300)
 Tréban (81302)
 Trébas (81303)
 Trévien (81304)
 Valderiès (81306)
 Valence-d'Albigeois (81308)
 Vaour (81309)
 Le Verdier (81313)
 Vieux (81316)
 Villefranche-d'Albigeois (81317)
 Villeneuve-sur-Vère (81319)
 Vindrac-Alayrac (81320)
 Virac (81322)

History

The arrondissement of Albi was created in 1800.

As a result of the reorganisation of the cantons of France which came into effect in 2015, the borders of the cantons are no longer related to the borders of the arrondissements. The cantons of the arrondissement of Albi were, as of January 2015:

 Alban
 Albi-Centre
 Albi-Est
 Albi-Nord-Est
 Albi-Nord-Ouest
 Albi-Ouest
 Albi-Sud
 Cadalen
 Carmaux-Nord
 Carmaux-Sud
 Castelnau-de-Montmiral
 Cordes-sur-Ciel
 Gaillac
 Lisle-sur-Tarn
 Monestiés
 Pampelonne
 Rabastens
 Réalmont
 Salvagnac
 Valderiès
 Valence-d'Albigeois
 Vaour
 Villefranche-d'Albigeois

References

Albi